Emirates Airline has diversified into related industries and sectors, including airport services, event organization, engineering, catering, and tour operator operations. Emirates has four subsidiaries, and its parent company has more than 50.

Subsidiaries
Emirates has over six subsidiaries and associates, which include:

Congress Solutions International
The company is a subsidiary of Emirates providing administrative support, managing data, and coordinating third party suppliers such as venues, catering, and accommodation. It deals with conferences and provides support to delegates, as well as providing leisure and recreational activities for visiting delegates.

CSI has hosted large events such as the Global Travel and Tourism Council, which around 1,300 delegates attended. It also hosted on behalf of the World Economic Forum and the government of Dubai, a summit on the Global Agenda attended by 700 business, government and academia representatives.

Arabian Adventures
Arabian adventures is a subsidiary of Emirates, and organises tours, safaris and other activities across the UAE.

Emirates Holidays
Emirates Holidays is the tour operating arm of Emirates.
Emirates Holidays top destinations are Dubai, Malaysia, Thailand, the Maldives and Mauritius.

Emirates Tours
This is the official tour operator of Emirates. It provides holiday packages and special vacation offers to passengers travelling on Emirates.

Emirates hotels and resorts
As of 1 November 2007, the Emirates Group has launched the first of the Emirates Hotels & Resorts Residences with The Harbour Hotel & Residence. This is a hotel and residential tower located in Dubai Marina. It was the first of six international properties expected to open in 2008.

Emirates Destination and Leisure Management
Destination and Leisure Management manage the Emirates Group portfolio of hotels, serviced apartments, spas and business conference facilities. The portfolio includes the Emirates Al Maha Desert Resort.

References

External links
 Official Emirates website
 The Emirates Group
 Desert Safari

Subsidiaries